Arctaspis is an extinct genus of placoderm fish, which lived during the Devonian period in what is now Norway.

References 

Placoderm genera
Placoderms of Europe
Devonian placoderms
Phlyctaeniidae
Fossils of Norway